Anelaphus nanus is a species of beetle in the family Cerambycidae. It was described by Johan Christian Fabricius in 1792. It is found in the Caribbean.

References

Anelaphus
Beetles described in 1792